Ulmus changii var. kunmingensis W. C. Cheng, occasionally referred to as the Kunming elm, is a Chinese tree endemic to montane forests at elevations of 600–1800 m in the provinces of Guangxi, Guizhou, Sichuan, and Yunnan.

Description
The variety is distinguished by "branchlets occasionally with swelling and irregularly longitudinally fissured corky layers. Leaf blade abaxially with tufted hairs in the axil of the veins. Flowers on mixed buds, scattered in basal or sub-basal bract axils of young branches. Fl. and fr. same as for autonym variety but slightly earlier in season".

Pests and diseases
No information available.

Cultivation
The tree is not known to be in cultivation beyond China.

References

changii var. kunmingensis
Trees of China
Flora of China
Trees of Asia
Flora of Guangxi
Flora of Guizhou
Ulmus articles missing images
Elm species and varieties